FlyOristano was an Italian regional airline based at Oristano-Fenosu Airport in Oristano, Sardinia. Flight operations began on 3 June 2010 and ended on 27 January 2011.

History
The airline was founded as a partnership by the airport operator, Sogeaor, to provide passenger service from Oristano but was not licensed by the Italian Civil Aviation Authority and after starting service on 3 June 2010 following delays, was ordered to cease operations. Although an aircraft was painted in FlyOristano livery, services were actually provided by Denim Air. A second aircraft was introduced in mid-August but returned on 27 August; following monetary problems, the airline ceased operations after Denim Air withdrew services on 26 January 2011 and the regional authorities blocked hiring and increased control over the accounts. Sogeaor went into liquidation at the end of May 2011.

Destinations

Milan - Milan Malpensa Airport
Oristano - Oristano-Fenosu Airport
Pisa - Galileo Galilei Airport
Rome - Leonardo da Vinci-Fiumicino Airport

Fleet
The FlyOristano fleet included the following aircraft:

See also
 List of defunct airlines of Italy

References

External links
, archived on 9 January 2011 

Italian companies established in 2010
Italian companies disestablished in 2011
Defunct airlines of Italy
Airlines established in 2010
Airlines disestablished in 2011
Transport in Sardinia